
Blue Cliff Monastery is an  Thiền Buddhist monastery located in Pine Bush, New York. It was founded in May 2007 by monastic and lay practitioners from the Plum Village Tradition.

The monastery is under the direction of Thích Nhất Hạnh's Order of Interbeing in the Thiền tradition.  Blue Cliff Monastery follows the same practices and daily schedules as its root monastery Plum Village and its sister monasteries Deer Park Monastery in Escondido, California, and Magnolia Grove Monastery in Batesville, Mississippi.

Blue Cliff Monastery was created when the monastics moved from Maple Forest Monastery and the Green Mountain Dharma Center. In 1997 Maple Forest Monastery was founded in Woodstock, Vermont, and a year later Green Mountain Dharma Center was founded in Hartland, Vermont. Maple Forest was the monks' residence and Green Mountain was the nuns' residence. In May 2007 both centers moved to Blue Cliff Monastery.

The Monastery is located in the lush, green Hudson Valley of New York (one hour and 30 minutes away from NYC). Inside the property there are two ponds and a creek, and out of its 80 acres, 65 are forest. Visitors are welcome to practice mindfulness with the multifold community of monks, nuns and laypeople. Typically, days of mindfulness are held twice a week (Thursdays and Sundays). Retreats are held frequently throughout the year.

Gallery

See also
Buddhism in the United States
Buddhist monasticism
List of Buddhist temples
Timeline of Zen Buddhism in the United States
Plum Village Monastery

References

External links

Asian-American culture in New York (state)
Buddhist temples in New York (state)
Plum Village Tradition
Buddhist monasteries in the United States
Religious buildings and structures in New York (state)
Overseas Vietnamese Buddhist temples
Overseas Vietnamese organizations in the United States
Vietnamese-American history
2007 establishments in New York (state)